The enzyme D-cysteine desulfhydrase (EC  4.4.1.15) catalyzes the chemical reaction

D-cysteine + H2O  sulfide + NH3 + pyruvate

This enzyme belongs to the family of lyases, specifically the class of carbon-sulfur lyases.  The systematic name of this enzyme class is D-cysteine sulfide-lyase (deaminating; pyruvate-forming). Other names in common use include D-cysteine lyase, and D-cysteine sulfide-lyase (deaminating).  This enzyme participates in cysteine metabolism.

References

 
 
 

EC 4.4.1
Enzymes of unknown structure